Daouda Camara (born 20 August 1997) is a Guinean footballer.

External links 
 
 

1997 births
Living people
Guinean footballers
Guinea under-20 international footballers
Guinea international footballers
Association football forwards
FC Séquence de Dixinn players
Horoya AC players
Guinée Championnat National players
Guinea A' international footballers
2016 African Nations Championship players
2018 African Nations Championship players